Ryoo Seung-wan (born December 15, 1973) is a South Korean film director.

Early life
Ryoo Seung-wan was born in 1973 in Onyang, a small town in South Chungcheong Province. With the choice of domestic films mostly limited to propaganda and hostess films due to extreme government censorship, young Ryoo often opted for the more kinetic and free-spirited action films from the Shaw Brothers canon. Watching Jackie Chan's Drunken Master turned him into a lifelong fan, and Ryoo spent his youth building his knowledge of and love for Hong Kong-style action films. Dreaming of becoming a film director someday, he took taekwondo lessons and saved lunch money for three years during middle school to buy an 8mm camera, with which he shot short films.

Career

Early years
Ryoo became his family's sole breadwinner after he lost his parents while in middle school. He later dropped out of high school in 1992 and worked for six months to raise enough money to cover a year's worth of basic living expenses for his family. After that he joined a private film workshop, and paid his tuition through several part-time jobs: as a construction worker, hotel janitor, vegetable cart driver, and even an instructor at an illegal driving school. Ryoo, a fan of a young unknown director named Park Chan-wook's 1992 debut The Moon Is... the Sun's Dream and his work as a critic, went to meet Park and the two quickly became friends. Those formative years also saw Ryoo's debut as a 'real' director, with the 1996 short Transmutated Head. The 19-minute short's DP was Jang Joon-hwan (then a young film academy student), and it featured many familiar faces in the Korean indie scene, including character actor Heo Jong-soo and Lee Mu-young (future director of The Humanist).

With a few years of experience as assistant director on Whispering Corridors and Park's 1997 film Trio, Ryoo was ready to jumpstart his own career. Ryoo's debut was initially planned as a full-fledged feature film, but various issues forced him to instead shoot separate short films sharing common characters and themes. In 1998 his short film Rumble won him the Best Film at the 1998 Busan Short Film Festival, and a year later he signed a contract to develop a feature film out of Rumble and three following sequels, one of which was his short Modern Man, which was not only the audience's favorite, but also won Best Film at a Short Film Festival in 1999. In an era when blockbusters like Shiri and Joint Security Area were the rage in Korean cinema, the action dramedy became an instant sensation. Starring in the film himself along with some industry friends and even his little brother Ryoo Seung-bum, Ryoo became an instant cult hit, praised left and right for his masterful debut. With his directorial debut, Ryoo became known as the "Action Kid."

With the country experiencing tremendous growth in high-speed Internet penetration, a few companies tried to bank on this momentum by producing online short films. In 2000 the now defunct Cine4M website released a short film by Ryoo alongside Jang Jin's A Terrible Day and Kim Jee-woon's Coming Out. Titled after industry slang ("tachimawari" is a part of Kabuki theater plays that involve spectacular action scenes), the short Dachimawa Lee was a wild and hilarious parody of the films he grew up with: Korean action films of the 60s and 70s, Bruce Lee and Shaw Brothers flicks, the machismo kitsch of old Korean melodramas, and of course Jackie Chan. Coupling over-the-top voice dubbing with deliberately mistimed action, Dachimawa Lee was an enormous success online, making lead actor Im Won-hee a minor star and the Ryoo Brothers even bigger names.

Big expectations often lead to equally big disappointments, which is what industry insiders and critics felt about Ryoo's first real feature film, the gritty action noir No Blood No Tears. The film mixed big stars like Jeon Do-yeon with talented actors from the theater world like Jung Jae-young. Joining Director Ryoo once again was his younger brother Seung-bum, who was starting to make a name for himself in the industry independent of his brother. Misunderstood as a Guy Ritchie or Quentin Tarantino clone, Ryoo's film was an exhilarating mix of all the elements that made Die Bad one of the best debuts films in Chungmuro's recent history, but it also added a nasty streak of ultra-realism. The latter was contributed by Jung Doo-hong, occasionally an actor, but better known as the best action choreographer in the country, whose extreme realism balanced Ryoo's more fantasy-oriented cinematic sensibilities. With No Blood No Tears a flop at the box office, it was a difficult period for Ryoo, who clearly felt betrayed by the same people who had put impossible expectations on his shoulders.

After that disappointment, Ryoo collaborated again with Jung Doo-hong and brother Seung-bum, along with newcomer Yoon So-yi. The four embarked on Arahan, part modern-day wuxia and part local comedy. Despite its commercial success, critics still weren't pleased, continuing to lament the loss of Chungmuro's enfant prodige.

It took another two years for Ryoo to come back, but 2005's Crying Fist was in many ways proof he had matured beyond easy labels and traditional genre boundaries. Ryoo was more than just an action kid. Starring acclaimed veteran actor Choi Min-sik, the film saw the official birth of a new star, Ryoo Seung-bum. Steadily impressing critics and audiences since his debut in 2000, Ryoo displayed amazing energy and range in the film, such that he often overshadowed his older, more prestigious colleague. But the real star of Crying Fist was none other than Ryoo Seung-wan. Finally stripping himself from genre tropes, he was able to draw an incredible emotional portrayal of two people winning the most important boxing game of their life: the match against their own inner demons. More a story of survival than a simple sports drama, Crying Fist opened on April 1, 2005 against Ryoo's old friend Kim Jee-woon's A Bittersweet Life, offering one of the best double-headers of 2005. The two films garnered excellent reviews, but ended up canceling each other at the box office, selling a little over a million tickets a piece.

After the success of 2003's If You Were Me, South Korea's National Commission on Human Rights commissioned a second omnibus film in 2006, If You Were Me 2. Five directors — Park Kyung-hee, Jang Jin, Jung Ji-woo, Kim Dong-won and Ryoo — contributed short films on a human rights issue of their choosing. Ryoo's short Hey Man! is almost one complete take of a man (Kim Su-yeon) with multiple prejudices that lead him to cast off every one of his "friends" and fellow patrons who are sharing the communal space of a late night restaurant.

In 2006 Seoul Art Cinema organized a special program "Anatomy of Violence: Ryoo Seung-wan's Action School" wherein Ryoo selected 10 films to screen and discuss with participants, including five of his own works. The program aimed to better understand the art of action filmmaking.

Waiting to secure funding for his first zombie film Yacha, Ryoo decided to take his friend Jung Doo-hong for another challenge, making one last salute to the pure action flicks he grew up with and gave him his nickname. The two had some acting experience, Jung mostly in Ryoo's films and Ryoo with Die Bad, a supporting role in Lee Chang-dong's Oasis, and a couple of cameos in Park Chan-wook films. But this was another story: for the first time, Jung and Ryoo would be the stars. Produced under CJ Entertainment, The City of Violence is a low-budget HD action film meant to show the potential of the new technology. As Ryoo described it, The City of Violence is like a Jackie Chan-style pure action film with characters from a Chang Cheh film in a world similar to that of Roman Polanski's Chinatown. The film brings to a final duel the two conflicting philosophies of the longtime partners (the Korean title of the film, Jjakpae, means partner). Fantasy and realism, outlandish technique and brutally raw streetfight-style action, combine to form pure cinematic flow.

In 2009 Ryoo directed four mini-movies for the Korea Tourism Organization targeted at the Chinese market. Each movie tells a story that represents the beauty of Korea's travel locations through four themes: Hallyu (Korean movies and dramas), food, shopping and trendy places to visit like Hongdae or Cheongdam-dong. The tourism commercials starred Gao Yuanyuan and Li Guangjie as a Chinese couple, with cameos by Song Seung-heon, Park Hae-jin and Park Eun-hye.

Then to promote the release of Motorola's new model MOTO Klassic, Ryoo wrote and directed a 22-minute short film starring American-born Japanese martial arts star Kane Kosugi and action choreographer Jung Doo-hong. Titled Timeless and set at Jung's stunt school, the mockumentary-style short eschews the use of CGI in fight scenes and advances the return to old school action.

2010 - present
His 2010 film The Unjust, a tale about corruption among policemen and prosecutors, received rave reviews for its seamless storytelling interspersed with action sequences, social commentary and powerhouse performances from Hwang Jung-min and brother Seung-bum. It was successful at the box office with more than 2.7 million tickets sold, landing it on that year's top ten box office list.

Ryoo's next movie The Berlin File was an espionage thriller about a North Korean spy who is betrayed and cut loose when a weapons deal is exposed. While preparing for the film, Ryoo met with several North Korean defectors and shot the documentary Spies for Korean broadcaster MBC as part of a special series that aired in 2011, intending "to make a realistic, fast-paced, Korean-style espionage action film about South Korean agents discovering North Korea's secret accounts and how political dynamics between the two Koreas get involved." Ryoo said he wanted the film to be reminiscent of The Bourne Identity, and on an emotional level, to focus on the solitude and sorrow of those who live as secret agents. It was shot almost 100% on location in Europe, namely in Berlin, Germany and Riga, Latvia. The film attracted 7.17 million admissions in early 2013 to become the all-time highest-grossing Korean action film. But because of its big budget, it barely broke even commercially. Ryoo later said that the picture failed to fully connect with younger audiences which know little of the Cold War era, and that "after making such an expensive film, (his) take-away was that (he) needed to make a cheaper one."

In 2015, Ryoo wrote and directed Veteran, an action film about an amoral and powerful third-generation business tycoon doggedly pursued by a detective investigating the mysterious injuries of a truck driver. Ryoo said, "Because (the movie) is about the world I know and the story about people I know, it was comfortable for me. [...] But my feeling comfortable doesn't mean that the work is easy. It just means that I'm comfortable (working out the troubles). [...] I didn't want the movie to be based on personal revenge, and I want it to show how a person gets justice through the legal system." It is the biggest hit of Ryoo's career and currently the 5th all-time highest-grossing film in Korean cinema history.

His next project was The Battleship Island, set on Hashima Island, an outlying island abandoned by Japan off the coast of Nagasaki, where countless Koreans were drafted into forced labor during World War II. The film follows a group of American OSS agents and Korean independence fighters on a mission to evacuate a key Korean figure from the island.

In 2021, Ryoo directed Escape from Mogadishu, a film based on real events of the Somali Civil War in the 1990s. It depicted details of perilous escape attempt made by North and South Korean embassy personnel stranded during the conflict. The film made with production cost of 24 billion was entirely shot in Morocco. It was selected as the South Korean entry for the Best International Feature Film at the 94th Academy Awards.

Personal life
Ryoo is married to Kang Hye-jung, film producer and CEO of their production company Filmmaker R&K. They met when Kang was a crew member on his 1996 short Transmutated Head.

Filmography

References

External links
 Ryoo Seung-wan at Korean Film Biz Zone
 
 
 

1973 births
South Korean male film actors
South Korean film producers
South Korean film directors
South Korean screenwriters
Living people
South Korean male taekwondo practitioners
21st-century South Korean male actors
Best Director Paeksang Arts Award (film) winners
Grand Prize Paeksang Arts Award (Film) winners